Confederacy of Silence: A True Tale of the New Old South is a 2002 book by Richard Rubin.  It is about Rubin's experience as a recent University of Pennsylvania graduate and work as a reporter in Greenwood, Mississippi. It was published by Atria Books in 2002.

References

External links 
 Richard Rubin's website

Interviews with Rubin about Confederacy of Silence 
 North Country Public Radio. May 13, 2009
 Andrew Meyer. WBGO Radio. December 27, 2002
 The Tavis Smiley Show. National Public Radio. September 19, 2002
 The Diane Rehm Show. National Public Radio. August 1, 2002
 The Education of Richard Rubin. The Memphis Flyer. July 19, 2002
 The Leonard Lopate Show. WNYC Radio. July 2, 2002
 Deep in the Heard Of Dixie. The Atlantic Monthly. July 31, 2002

African-American history of Mississippi
American non-fiction books
Books about African-American history
History of African-American civil rights
2002 non-fiction books